By the early 19th century, Daniel Bennett was the most important owner of vessels engaging in whale hunting in the Southern Whale Fishery. At one point he had some 17 vessels out whale hunting. He also owned vessels that were traders rather than whalers.

Bennett purchased vessels rather than having them built for him. Many of Bennett's vessels appear to have been prizes to the Royal Navy, or warships that the Navy was disposing of after the end of the French Revolutionary (1802), or Napoleonic Wars (1815). Name changes make it difficult, or impossible absent original research, to identify many of the vessels' earlier histories.

The list below is primarily from Stanbury, but also incorporates information from articles on the vessels themselves.

Active (1789–1792)
 (1801–1803}
 (1804–1805)
 (1804–1808)
African (1803–1810)
Ann (1793–1797)
 (1804–1805)
Arab (1819–1820)
 (1813–1824)
 (1800-1802)
 (1810–1811)
Betsy (1785 or 1791–1811)
 (1800–1806)
Cape Packet (1821–1830)
 (1813–1833)
Ceres (1791)
Conservative (1836)
 (1794)
Currency Lass (1839)
Daniel (1818–1832)
Daniel IVth (1823–1830)
Diana (1802–1821)
Diana (1829-April 1843)
Dave (1827–1832)
 (1797–1811)
 (1809–1821)
 (1824–1842)
 (1795–1805)
Fancy (1790)
Fanny (1794–1803)
Favorite (1799–1803)
Favourite (1808)
Favourite (1819–1823)
Favourite (1816–1845)
 (1802–1816)
 (1796–1803)
Francis (1819–1826)
 (1813–1821)
Georgia Packet (1813)
 (1815–1822)
Greenwich (1830–1833)
 (1799)
Hunter (1815–1822)
 (1796–1827)
 (1802–1822)
James Hay (1818–1822)
Japan (1831)
Kent (1838–1844)
 (1798–1802)
Lively (1786–1792)
 (1799–1808)
 (1792–1796)
Lovely Ann (1819–1825)
Lucy (1804)
 (1817–1820)
Magnet (1832–1835)
Mariana/Marianne/Mary Ann (1818–1830)
Mary (1805–1810)
 (1821–1823)
 (1813)
Nereid/Neried (1814)
 (1808–1825)
Nimrod (1839)
Ocean (1820–1825)
Ocean (1822–1825)
 (1812–1829)
 (1796–1798)
 (1803–1807)
Ranger (1804–1819)
Ranger (1819–1832)
Ranger (1836–1848)
Rapid (1820–1826)
Recovery (1802–1813)
Recovery (1813–1843)
Recovery (1810–1817)
 (1833–1838)
 (1816–1825)
Royal Sovereign (1825–1835)
Sally (1796–1814)
Sarah (1821–1837)
 (1815-1833)
Sisters (1825–1830)
Sprightly (1801–1809)
Timor (1813–1834)
 (1817–1829)
 (1805–1811)
Vere (1790-1793)
 (1825–1827)
 (1794-1810)

The following vessels are listed in Stanbury, but appear not to be whalers, or Bennett-owned vessels.

  (1824–1833)
Stormont (1784–c.1794)
Tyne (1821–1831)

Notes

Citations

References
 
 

Age of Sail merchant ships of England
Whaling ships